Prince John (John Charles Francis; 12 July 1905 – 18 January 1919) was the fifth son and youngest of the six children of King George V and Queen Mary. At the time of his birth, his father was heir apparent to the reigning monarch of the United Kingdom, King Edward VII. In 1910, the Prince of Wales succeeded to the throne upon Edward VII's death and Prince John became fifth in the line of succession to the British throne.

In 1909, John was discovered to have epilepsy. As his condition deteriorated, he was sent to live at Sandringham House in 1916 and was kept away from the public eye. There, he was cared for by his governess, "Lala" Bill, and befriended local children whom his mother had gathered to be his playmates. He died at Sandringham in 1919, following a severe seizure, and was buried at nearby St Mary Magdalene Church. His illness was disclosed to the wider public only after his death.

John's seclusion has subsequently been brought forward as evidence of inhumanity by the royal family. Contrary to the belief that he was hidden from the public from an early age, however, John for most of his life had the role of a fully fledged member of the family, appearing frequently in public until after his eleventh birthday, when his condition became severe.

Birth

John was born at York Cottage on the Sandringham Estate on 12 July 1905, at 3:05 am.
He was the youngest child and fifth son of George, Prince of Wales, and Mary, Princess of Wales.
He was named John despite that name's unlucky associations for the royal family, but was informally known as "Johnnie".
At the time of his birth, he was sixth in the line of succession to the throne, behind his father and four older brothers. As a grandchild of the reigning British monarch in the male line, and a son of the Prince of Wales, he was formally styled His Royal Highness Prince John of Wales from birth.

John was christened on 3 August 1905 in the parish church of St Mary Magdalene at Sandringham, the Reverend Canon John Neale Dalton officiating.
His godparents were King Carlos I of Portugal; John's uncles Prince Carl of Denmark and Alexander Duff, 1st Duke of Fife; his great-granduncle Prince Johann of Schleswig-Holstein-Sonderburg-Glücksburg; and three of his first cousins once removed, the Duke and Duchess of Sparta and Princess Alexander of Teck. John's father stood proxy for King Carlos, Prince Carl, Prince Johann and the Duke of Fife, while John's aunt Princess Victoria stood proxy for the Duchess of Sparta and Princess Alexander.

Childhood and illness 

Much of John's early life was spent at Sandringham with his siblingsPrince Edward (known as David to the royal family), Prince Albert, Princess Mary, Prince Henry and Prince Georgeunder the care of their nanny Charlotte "Lala" Bill.
Though a strict disciplinarian, John's father was nonetheless affectionate toward his children; John's mother was close to her children and encouraged them to confide in her.
In 1909, Prince John's grandaunt, the Dowager Empress of Russia wrote to her son, Emperor Nicholas II, that "George's children are very nice... The little ones, George and Johnny are both charming and very amusing..." John's aunt Princess Alice, Countess of Athlone, described him as "very quaint and one evening when Uncle George returned from stalking he bent over Aunt May and kissed her, and they heard Johnny soliloquize, 'She kissed Papa, ugly old man! George V once said to U.S. president Theodore Roosevelt that "all [his] children [were] obedient, except John"apparently because he alone, among the King's children, escaped punishment from their father.

Though a "large and handsome" baby, John had become "winsome" and "painfully slow" by his fourth birthday.
That same year he had his first epileptic seizure and showed signs of a disability, probably autism or learning disabilities. When his father became king, John did not attend his parents' coronation on 22 June 1911, as this was considered too risky for his health; nonetheless, cynics said that the family feared their reputation would be damaged by any incident involving him. Although Prince John was deemed not "presentable to the outside world," the King nonetheless showed an interest in his youngest son, offering him "kindness and affection".

During his time at Sandringham, John exhibited some repetitive behaviours as well as regular misbehaviours and insubordination: "he simply didn't understand he needed to [behave]." Nonetheless, there was hope his seizures might lessen with time. Contrary to the belief that he was hidden from the public from an early age, Prince John for most of his life was a "fully-fledged member of the family", appearing frequently in public until after his eleventh birthday.

In 1912 Prince George, John's closest sibling, began St Peter's Court Preparatory School at Broadstairs. The following summer, The Times reported that Prince John would not attend Broadstairs the following term, and that his parents had not decided whether to send him to school at all. After the outbreak of World War I, he rarely saw his parents, who were often away on official duties, and his siblings, who were either at boarding school or in the military. He slowly disappeared from the public eye and no official portraits of him were commissioned after 1913. In spite of his physical and mental decline, he was not removed from the line of succession.

Wood Farm 
In 1916, as his seizures became more frequent and severe, John was sent to live at Wood Farm, with "Lala" Bill having charge of his care.
Though he maintained an interest in the world around him and was capable of coherent thought and expression,
with his lack of educational progress, the last of his tutors was dismissed and his formal education ended. Physicians warned that he would likely not reach adulthood.

At Wood Farm, John became "a satellite with his own little household on an outlying farm on the Sandringham estate... Guests at Balmoral remember him during the Great War as tall and muscular, but always a distant figure glimpsed from afar in the woods, escorted by his own retainers."
His grandmother Queen Alexandra maintained a garden at Sandringham House especially for him, and this became "one of the great pleasures of [Prince John]'s life."

After the summer of 1916, John was rarely seen outside the Sandringham Estate and passed solely into "Lala" Bill's care.
After Queen Alexandra wrote that "[Prince John] is very proud of his house but is longing for a companion,"
Queen Mary broke from royal practice by having local children brought in to be playmates for Prince John.
One of these was Winifred Thomas, a young girl from Halifax who had been sent to live with her aunt and uncle (who had charge of the royal stables at Sandringham) in hopes her asthma would improve.
Prince John had known Winifred years earlier, prior to the outbreak of World War I.
Now they became close, taking nature walks together and working in Queen Alexandra's garden. Prince John also played with his elder siblings when they visited: once, when his two eldest brothers came to visit, the Prince of Wales "took him for a run in a kind of a push-cart, and they both disappeared from view."

Death 
John's seizures intensified, and Bill later wrote "we dared not let him be with his brothers and sister, because it upsets them so much, with the attacks getting so bad and coming so often."
Biographer Denis Judd believes that Prince "[John]'s seclusion and 'abnormality' must have been disturbing to his brothers and sister", as he had been "a friendly, outgoing little boy, much loved by his brothers and sister, a sort of mascot for the family".
He spent Christmas Day 1918 with his family at Sandringham House but was driven back to Wood Farm at night.

On 18 January 1919, after a severe seizure, John died in his sleep at Wood Farm at 5:30 pm.

Queen Mary wrote in her diary that the news wasa great shock, tho' for the poor little boy's restless soul, death came as a great relief. [She] broke the news to George and [they] motored down to Wood Farm. Found poor Lala very resigned but heartbroken. Little Johnnie looked very peaceful lying there.

Mary later wrote to Emily Alcock, an old friend, thatfor [John] it is a great relief, as his malady was becoming worse as he grew older,& he has thus been spared much suffering. I cannot say how grateful we feel to God for having taken him in such a peaceful way, he just slept quietly into his heavenly home, no pain no struggle, just peace for the poor little troubled spirit which had been a great anxiety to us for many years, ever since he was four years old.She went on to add that "the first break in the family circle is hard to bear, but people have been so kind& sympathetic& this has helped us much." George described his son's death simply as "the greatest mercy possible".

On 20 January, the Daily Mirror said that "when the Prince passed away his face bore an angelic smile"; its report also made the first public mention of Prince John's epilepsy. 
His funeral was the next day at St Mary Magdalene parish church, John Neale Dalton officiating.
Queen Mary wrote thatCanon Dalton& Dr Brownhill [John's physician] conducted the service which was awfully sad and touching. Many of our own people and the villagers were present. We thanked all Johnnie's servants who have been so good and faithful to him.Though nominally private, the funeral was attended by Sandringham House staff; "every single person on the estate went and stood around the gates and his grave was absolutely covered in flowers." Queen Alexandra wrote to Queen Mary that "now [their] two darling Johnnies lie side by side".

Legacy
Prince Edward, who was eleven years older than his brother and had hardly known Prince John, saw his death as "little more than a regrettable nuisance." He wrote to his mistress of the time that "the poor boy had become more of an animal than anything else." Edward also wrote an insensitive letter to Queen Mary, which has since been lost. She did not reply, but he felt compelled to write her an apology, in which he stated:"I feel such a cold hearted and unsympathetic swine for writing all that I did ... No one can realize more than you how little poor Johnnie meant to me who hardly knew him ... I feel so much for you, darling Mama, who was his mother."In her final mention of Prince John in her diary, Queen Mary wrote simply "miss the dear child very much indeed." She gave Winifred Thomas a number of John's books, which she had inscribed, "In memory of our dear little Prince." "Lala" Bill always kept a portrait of Prince John above her mantelpiece, together with a letter from him that read "nanny, I love you."

In recent years, Prince John's seclusion has been brought forward as claimed evidence of the "heartlessness" of the Windsor family. According to a 2008 Channel 4 documentary, much of the existing information about Prince John is "based on hearsay and rumour, precisely because so few details of his life and his problems have ever been disclosed," and the British Epileptic Association has stated,"There was nothing unusual in what [the King and Queen] did. At that time, people with epilepsy were put apart from the rest of the community. They were often put in epilepsy colonies or mental institutions. It was thought to be a form of mental illness" …adding that it was another twenty years before the idea that epileptics should not be locked away began to take hold.
One author has claimed that the royal family believed that these afflictions might flow through their blood, which was then still believed to be purer than the blood of a commoner, and, as such, wished to hide as much as possible in regard to Prince John's illness.
Others have suggested that Prince John was sent to Wood Farm to give him the best environment possible under the "austere" conditions of World War I.
Another author has claimed that undoubtedly the royal family were "frightened and ashamed of John's illness", and yet another author has claimed that Prince John's life is "usually portrayed either as tragedy or conspiracy".
At the time that Edward VIII (formerly Prince Edward) abdicated, an attempt was made to discredit Prince Albert, who had succeeded as George VI, by suggesting that he was subject to falling fits, like his brother.
In 1998, after the discovery of two volumes of family photographs, Prince John was briefly brought to public attention.

The Lost Prince, a biographical drama about Prince John's life written and directed by Stephen Poliakoff, was released in 2003.

Titles and styles 
 12 July 1905 – 6 May 1910: His Royal Highness Prince John of Wales
 6 May 1910 – 18 January 1919: His Royal Highness The Prince John

Ancestry

References

Endnotes

Footnotes

Sources 

 
 
 
 
 
 
 
 
 
 
  
 Archived at Ghostarchive and the Wayback Machine:

External links 

 

1905 births
1919 deaths
20th-century British people
British people of German descent
British princes
Children of George V
Deaths from epilepsy
English people with disabilities
House of Windsor
Neurological disease deaths in England
People from Sandringham, Norfolk
Princes of the United Kingdom
Royalty and nobility with disabilities
Royalty who died as children
Sons of emperors
Sons of kings